Narawala is a medium size village that is situated in Galle District, southern province of Sri Lanka.

References

Populated places in Galle District
Sri Lanka articles missing geocoordinate data
Populated places in Southern Province, Sri Lanka